The Impossibles is a series of American animated cartoons produced by Hanna-Barbera in 1966 broadcast by CBS. The series of shorts (six minutes each) appeared as part of Frankenstein Jr. and The Impossibles.

Setup
Posing as a trio of young rock 'n roll musicians, The Impossibles were actually crime fighters, with superpowers, dedicated to battling evil supervillains of all shapes and sizes. When performing for their adoring fans (usually star-struck, screaming teenyboppers), the lads would play their mod, futuristic-looking guitars atop an equally futuristic bandstand (emblazoned with their "Impossibles" logo on the side, a la Ringo Starr's drumkit) that could convert into a car (the "Impossi-Mobile"), or a jet (the "Impossi-Jet"), a speedboat, or even a submarine. Their standard catch cry when called into action was "Rally ho!"

Their humorous dialogue was typically peppered with puns. As with many Hanna-Barbera characters, the Impossibles were topical and inspired by the times, in this case resembling the rock 'n roll groups of the mid-Sixties.

Characters

The Impossibles
Each member of the Impossibles had a specific and visual superpower:

 Coil-Man (voiced by Hal Smith) - Short, barrel-chested and sporting a mod haircut, blond "Coily" could transform his arms and legs into impossibly stretchable or coiled springs, allowing him to bounce to avoid attacks, deliver long-range punches, or drill through walls. Coil-Man usually drove the Impossi-jet, and his guitar contained a small TV receiver through which "Big D" (voiced by Paul Frees, who also served as the voice-over narrator in almost every episode) could contact the group and deliver orders (Big D used Multi Man's guitar in "The Fiendish Dr Futuro," "Beamatron" and "The Diabolical Dauber"). Because of his presumably metal coils, Coily could be held in place by a super magnet, but could also conduct heat or electricity with his coils. He hid in a closet disguised as a wire coat hanger, further implying that he was at least partially made of metal. Coil-Man's costume was purple and blue and included a purple mask and a cowl crested by a triangular fin.
 Fluid-Man (voiced by Paul Frees) - Dark-haired Fluid-Man, a.k.a. "Fluey", could morph parts (or all) of his body into a liquid form, allowing him to, for example, sneak up on an enemy though a water faucet. He could also vaporize himself into a cloud or storm, but could be soaked up and trapped by a sponge ("Televisatron" and "Return of the Spinner"), or frozen solid inside a block of ice ("Not So Nice Mr. Ice"). Fluid-Man's costume resembled a lime green wetsuit complete with diver's mask and swimfins. Fluey's speaking style indicated that he was the beatnik of the group.
 Multi-Man (voiced by Don Messick) - Multi-Man, a.k.a. "Multi", could create infinite duplicates of himself that were often destroyed, leaving only the original behind. His duplicates rarely, if ever, functioned independently, and were often used as camouflage, a bluff, for extra strength or transportation (he could fly by continuously creating replicas above himself). When duplicating himself, he could push tons of rocks out of the way or crack a block of solid concrete (in which he and the others were entombed). The character had shaggy orange hair that covered his eyes (his eyes, in fact, are never seen) and he usually holds a shield for apparently decorative reasons.  Multi showed the ability to repel bullets with his bare hand ("Fero, the Fiendish Fiddler"). Multi-Man's angular, red and black costume resembled a stylized 'M', and included a short, triangular red cape.  Favorite saying: "You got them all except the original." Multi bore a resemblance to the identical members of the singing group "The Way Outs" from The Flintstones.

Each episode usually began with the villain pulling off an improbable caper while The Impossibles were busy performing across town. The team is called into action by their chief "Big D" (voiced by Paul Frees). After a series of funny superpowered forays, the Impossibles capture the villain and return to finish their concert.

Villains
The Impossibles faced many bizarre villains. All villains were defeated in a timely manner and justice was always served.

The following villains have appeared more than once:

 Spinner (voiced by Hal Smith) - Has spider-based powers, specifically web spinning. He first appeared when he stole a million dollar tiara. Spinner later returned when he stole a poodle by the name of "Little Miss Muffet".
 Paper Doll Man (voiced by Don Messick) - Made of paper, he has the ability to slip underneath locked doors or fold himself into paper airplanes for a quick getaway. In his first appearance, Paper Doll Man stole most of the top secret plans from the Pentagon and had to return there to get Plan X. In his second appearance, Paper Doll Man was robbing hotels. This time, he was defeated when he accidentally flew into a linotype machine that was printing newspapers.
 Professor Stretch (voiced by Paul Frees) - Super-stretchy with elasticity powers. He appeared twice. The first time was when he sabotaged a tank by using powder from a shaker that turns anything into rubber and in the end we see him used as a basketball. The second time was when he created a monster made of rubber cooking chowder.

The following villains have only appeared once:

 Beamatron (voiced by Hal Smith) - Shoots laser beams from his fingers, although lasers had short battery lives.
 Bubbler (voiced by Don Messick) - Kidnaps the young Shah of Shishkabob (voiced by Ginny Tyler) by sealing him in an unbreakable bubble. The Bubbler has an undersea hideout at the bottom of the ocean.
 Octavius - A giant attack octopus who guards Bubbler's undersea hideout. Multi-Man ties Octavius' tentacles into knots.
 Burrower (voiced by Allan Melvin) - A villain who burrows under banks to pilfer the money inside.
 Muddy (Hal Smith) - Burrower's henchman.
 Curly (voiced by Don Messick) - Burrower's pet worm.
 Timeatron (voiced by Keye Luke) - A villain who uses a time cabinet to bring villains from the past to help him. These villains include Captain Kidd (voiced by Paul Frees), Jesse James (voiced by Don Messick), and Goliath (voiced by Hal Smith). Timeatron goes to bring back Alexander the Great (voiced by Don Messick), but ends up trapped in his time when Multi-Man destroys the time cabinet with an ax.
 Smogula (voiced by Alan Reed) - Floats around in a rain cloud and wields a weather-controlling ray-gun.
 Speck (voiced by Hal Smith) - Has a potion that lets him shrink and grow at will. He was arrested after trying to hide in a police officers watch.
 Mother Gruesome (voiced by June Foray) - A female witch-themed criminal who uses a machine that can bring villainous storybook characters to life like a giant and a dragon. She was eventually trapped in the same book as the giant and the book was donated to a prison library.
 Cromwell (voiced by Don Messick) - Mother Gruesome's pet crow.
 Fero (voiced by Don Messick) - Caricature of Nero, he is a fiddler who can send people and objects to anywhere he wishes with a high-tech violin. After his violin was swapped by the Impossibles, Fero was transported to Neptune where astrologers found him playing the fiddle there.
 Dauber (voiced by Paul Winchell) - An artist who brings to life anything that he paints.
 Televisitron (voiced by Hal Smith) - A villain who uses a remote control to send his foes into various channels of the television to do them in. The Impossibles steal Televistatron's remote and transport him into a prison show.
 Aquator (voiced by Paul Winchell) - An aquatic villain who steals a formula for changing the size of organisms in an attempt to create an army of giant-sized micro-organisms.
 Dragster (voiced by Paul Winchell impersonating Boris Karloff) - A speedy car thief with who steals a diamond-encrusted car.
 Puzzler (voiced by Paul Frees) - A supervillain who can change shape as a living puzzle. He is the only villain given an origin as he mentions to have fallen into a jigsaw-making machine which gave him his abilities.
 Surfer (voiced by Don Messick) - A villain who surfs and uses a remote-control ukulele.
 Sculptor (voiced by Lennie Weinrib) - A villain who carries a gun that fires quick-dry cement either turning people into statues or making instant rocks and walls.
 Spraysol (voiced by Hal Smith) - A villain who sports a helmet that sprays liquid or gas. He also speaks with a lisp.
 Diamond Dazzler (voiced by Alan Reed) - A villain who steals a diamond that contains a genie (voiced by Hal Smith). He carries multiple magic gemstone rings with different abilities.
 Twister (voiced by Don Messick) - A villain who dresses like a top with a propeller beanie who steals by spinning like a twister.
 Cronella Critch (voiced by Janet Waldo) - A witch who robbed a charity-for-orphans party. She was turned into a cat due to a spell reversal by Multi-Man.
 Tapper (voiced by Hal Smith) - A villain who can travel through telephone wires with his weapon, the Deciminator, which he uses to send Coil Man to Ackbar the Martian (voiced by Don Messick) in his flying saucer and Multi Man to Captain Cutlass (voiced by Alan Reed) on his smuggling ship the Sea Serpent.
 Angler (voiced by [Don Messick) - A villain who wears a torpedo-shaped fish suit that steals with a fishing rod.
 Ringmaster (voiced by Hal Smith) - A ringmaster-themed villain who has circus performers as his henchmen.
 Mr. Instant (voiced by Paul Frees) - A villain who carries a gun that can create anything in an instant.
 Dr. Futuro (voiced by Paul Frees) - A villain who travels from the 40th century to the 1960s to steal a gold brick to finance his crimes. He accidentally runs into an age-reversing machine and is turned into a baby.
 Clutcher (voiced by Don Messick) - A villain who created remote-controlled gloves for clutching anything at a distance.
 Mr. Ice (voiced by Hal Smith) - A villain who plans to conquer the city by freezing it.
 Freezer Freezer (Don Messick) - Mr. Ice's henchman.
 Batter (voiced by Don Messick) - A baseball player-themed villain who bases his crimes on baseball.

Some villains were made to serve a useful purpose and even went straight after their capture:

 Archer (voiced by Paul Frees) - A villain who dressed like Robin Hood. He later decided to become a musician upon his arrest where the Impossibles even joined him in a performance in prison.
 Inflator (voiced by Hal Smith) - A villain who attacks places with giant balloons that he creates using a special ray-gun. He has served his time and is now a balloon vendor selling his balloons to children. He claims his reason for villainy was due to monetary inflation.
 Billy the Kidder (voiced by Hal Smith) - A futuristic western outlaw that rides a robotic horse who wanted to rob the Mint. After serving his time, he becomes a rodeo star where he is uncomfortable riding actual horses.

An ad for the Saturday morning cartoon lineup in comic books of the time referred to "the Bubbler", "Bratfink", and "The Sponge".

The Impossibles episodes were written by Michael Maltese, who is known mostly for his work with director Chuck Jones.

Episodes

Comic books
A single issue of a Frankenstein Jr. and the Impossibles comic was released by Gold Key as a tie-in to the TV series, and the contents were reprinted in The Impossibles Annual in 1968. "The Impossibles" comic story was titled "The Impossibles vs. The Mirror-Man". A new text-based story, specially written for the annual was "The Impossibles Cure a Doctor", with the villainous Herr Doktor Adolf von Tischklautz. Big D is mistakenly called "Big B" in this story.

In 2016, the Impossibles appeared as part of the cast of the Future Quest comic book, where the origin of their powers is explored; having been exposed to a special radiation, as part of an experiment by F.E.A.R., they gained their powers and became agents for Big D who's a woman named Deva Sumadi. They are also joined by a fourth member, a girl called Esme Santos who has control over magnetic fields, who nicknamed herself Cobalt Blue. Together, they fight against an alien being called Omnikron, who absorbs everything and everyone in its path.

Adaptations
For the 1979 series The Super Globetrotters, the Impossibles' super powers were reassigned, entirely intact, to three members of the Globetrotters team. Coil Man was redesigned and renamed Spaghetti Man. Fluid Man was renamed Liquid Man. Multi Man was unchanged.

The Super Globetrotter costumes of Fluid Man/Liquid Man and of Multi Man remained the same as their Impossible counterparts (including the unexplained "F" on Liquid Man's wetsuit), except the color palettes were changed to match the Globetrotters' uniforms.  The transformation sequences and many of the signature "moves" from the 1966 series were re-drawn, frame by frame, to feature the superhero incarnations of the Harlem Globetrotters basketball team instead of the guitar-toting Impossibles.

References

External links

 The Impossibles - Cartoon Network Department of Cartoons (Archive)
 The Impossibles at the Big Cartoon DataBase
 The Impossibles at Don Markstein's Toonopedia. Archived from the original on September 1, 2016.

1960s American animated television series
1966 American television series debuts
1967 American television series endings
Animated musical groups
CBS original programming
Fictional musical groups
Hanna-Barbera superheroes
American children's animated superhero television series
American superhero comedy television series
Television series by Hanna-Barbera